Intrigo: Dear Agnes is a 2019 German-Swedish-American mystery crime drama film directed by Daniel Alfredson and starring Carla Juri, Gemma Chan and Jamie Sives.  It is the sequel of the 2018 film Intrigo: Death of an Author (2018).

Cast
Carla Juri as Agnes
Gemma Chan as Henny
Jamie Sives as Peter
Cal MacAninch as Erich Neuman-Hansen
John Sessions as Pumpermann
Predrag Bjelac as Caretaker
Ash Hunter as Johann Clausen
Laurie Kynaston as Johannes
Ed Cooper Clarke as Thomas Neuman-Hansen
Jason Wong as Benjamin
Tor Clark as Doris
Clemmie Dugdale as Clara
Jacob James Beswick as Klaus-Joseph
Chris Crema as Ansgar
Josephine Butler as Susanne Lieberman
Predrag Bjelac as caretaker
Ash Hunter as Johann Clausen
Amelia Clarkson as Louise
Anina Isabel Haghani as Cordelia
Elizabeth Counsell as Frau Bloeme
Kim Adis as student 1
Ivana Dudic as student 2
Olaf Ouwersloot as neighbor
Aleksandra Lojić as colleague

Reception
Kristen Yoonsoo Kim of The New York Times wrote: "Through flashbacks, the film traces the falling out that led to the women's current iciness. Their own connections, revealed bit by bit, make their plan even more ludicrous".

References

External links

American mystery drama films
American crime drama films
2019 crime drama films
German mystery drama films
German crime drama films
Swedish crime drama films
English-language German films
English-language Swedish films
Films based on Swedish novels
Films directed by Daniel Alfredson
Lionsgate films
2010s mystery drama films
Swedish mystery drama films
2010s English-language films
2010s American films
2010s German films
2010s Swedish films